NGC 526 is a pair of interacting lenticular galaxies in the constellation of Sculptor. Both the constituents are classified as S0 lenticular galaxies. This pair was first discovered by John Herschel on September 1, 1834. Dreyer, the compiler of the catalogue described the galaxy as "faint, small, a little extended, the preceding of 2", the other object being NGC 527.

See also 
 List of NGC objects (1–1000)

References

External links 
 
 
 SEDS

Lenticular galaxies
Sculptor (constellation)
0526
05120
Discoveries by John Herschel
Astronomical objects discovered in 1834